Mia Iris Jenkins (born 31 August 2000) is an English actress and singer. She is known for her roles as Alex in the Disney Channel musical drama The Lodge and Emma in the Disney Channel series Soy Luna. Following her appearances on Disney programmes, Jenkins has made various appearances in television series and films, including the Prime Video series Hanna, the BBC Three series Mood, and the Sky Atlantic series Domina.

Career 
Jenkins made her professional acting debut at the age of four in a touring production of Joseph and His Technicolour Dreamcoat. At age five, she played Gretl Von Trapp for two runs in the West End production of The Sound of Music. at the London Palladium. In 2007, at the age of six, Jenkins made her television debut in an episode of the Channel 5 series Hanrahan Investigates, as Kelly Bicknell. Following this, she continued her acting career, playing the role of Little Eponine, and subsequently Little Cosette in two consecutive runs of Les Misérables at the West End's Queen's Theatre. She went on to play Little Cosette again in 2010, at both the Barbican Theatre and in the production of Les Misérables in Concert: The 25th Anniversary. The production was originally performed and filmed at The O2 Arena, and later shown in cinemas across the UK. As a child, she had roles in numerous other West End productions, including Matilda, Scrooge, The Wizard of Oz and Gone With the Wind. She also toured the UK with productions including Chitty Chitty Bang Bang, and Annie.   

In 2012, she portrayed the role of Phoebe in City Slacker; an independent film. That same year, she portrayed the role of Mia Taylor in the film Secrets and Words.  She went on to play roles in Casualty and Necktie, a short film directed by Yorgos Lanthimos. In 2016, Jenkins appeared in the BBC soap opera EastEnders. She portrayed the recurring role of Hannah Reynolds for four episodes. In 2017, she starred in the Disney Channel musical drama The Lodge. She appeared in a total of 15 episodes, portraying the role of Alex. Later in 2017, Jenkins starred in the Disney Channel miniseries, Royal Ranch as Finny. The show premiered on the Disney Channel app and YouTube channel on 20 November 2017.

In 2017 and 2019, Jenkins appeared in the BBC Radio 4 sitcom The Wilsons Save the World, where she portrayed the role of Cat Wilson. In 2018, Jenkins had a recurring role in the third series of the Disney Channel series Soy Luna. In 2020, Jenkins filmed as lead character Amy Haines in the horror film The Piper. She also played the lead role in the short film Tiny Dancer, as well as featuring as a recurring character in the Prime Video series Hanna. In 2022, Jenkins appeared as a recurring character in BBC Three series Mood.  In 2023, she appeared as Ursa, a recurring character in the Sky Atlantic drama Domina.

Filmography

Film

Television

Stage

References

External links 
 

2000 births 
English television actresses 
English film actresses 
English child actresses 
English soap opera actresses
English stage actresses
Living people 
People from Feltham